The 12195 / 96 Agra Fort - Ajmer Junction Intercity Express is a Express train belonging to Indian Railways North Central Railway zone that runs between  and  in India.

Coaches
The 12195 / 96 Agra Fort Junction - Ajmer Junction Intercity Express has one AC Chair Car,  eight Chair Car, eight general unreserved & two SLR (seating with luggage rake) coaches . It does not carry a pantry car coach.

As is customary with most train services in India, coach composition may be amended at the discretion of Indian Railways depending on demand.

Service

Time Table

Traction
As the route is now fully electrified, a Jhansi based WAP-4 electric locomotive pulls the train to its destination.

References

External links
12195 Intercity Express at India Rail Info
12196 Intercity Express at India Rail Info

Intercity Express (Indian Railways) trains
Trains from Agra
Rail transport in Rajasthan
Transport in Ajmer